The 2022–23 Saudi Second Division is the 46th season of the Saudi Second Division since its establishment in 1976. The season began on 30 September 2022 and will conclude on 30 April 2023 with the final. The group stage draw was held on 9 June 2022. Fixtures for the 2022–23 season were announced on 25 August 2022.

Overview

Changes
On 9 October 2020, the Saudi FF announced that the number of teams in the league would be increased to 32, with each group consisting of 16 teams, starting from the 2022–23 season. To prepare for these changes it was announced that only 3 teams would be promoted to the MS League and 5 teams would be relegated from the MS League in the 2021–22 season.

On 14 April 2022, the Saudi FF announced that the number of teams in the Pro League would be increased from 16 to 18 teams. To prepare for this change, only 2 teams would be relegated to the First Division League and 4 teams would be promoted to the Pro League. This meant that 5 teams would be promoted from the Second Division to the First Division instead of the usual 3.

Team changes
A total of 32 teams are contesting the league, including 21 sides from the 2020–21 season, 5 relegated teams from the FD League, and 6 promoted teams from the Third Division.

The following teams have changed division since the 2021–22 season

To Second Division

Promoted from the Third Division

 Al-Suqoor
 Al-Qous
 Jerash
 Sajer
 Qilwah
 Al-Shaeib

Relegated from FD League
 Al-Jeel
 Al-Diriyah
 Al-Nahda
 Al-Kawkab
 Bisha

From Second Division
Promoted to FD League
 Al-Arabi
 Al-Qaisumah
 Al-Riyadh

Relegated to the Third Division
 Al-Dahab
 Afif
 Al-Nojoom
 Al-Thoqbah

Teams
Group A

Group B

Foreign players
The number of foreign players was increased from 3 players per team to 4 players per team.

Players name in bold indicates the player is registered during the mid-season transfer window.

Group A

League table

Results

Group B

League table

Results

Promotion play-off
Both teams that finish third in Groups A and B will face each other in a two-legged match with the winner gaining promotion to the FD League.

Final
The winners of each group will play a single-legged final on 30 April to decide the champion of the 2022–23 Second Division.

Statistics

Scoring

Top scorers

Hat-tricks 

Note
(H) – Home; (A) – Away4 Player scored 4 goals

Number of teams by province

See also
 2022–23 Saudi Professional League
 2022–23 Saudi First Division League
 2022–23 Saudi Third Division

References

3
Saudi Second Division seasons
Saudi Arabia, 3